Vladimir Aleksandrovich Shishelov (born 8 November 1979) is an Uzbekistani-Russian retired football forward.

Career
His first professional club was Qizilqum Zarafshon he began to play in 1996. In 1997-1999 he played for Zarafshon Navoi.  He moved in 2002 to Zimbru Chişinău. He played two seasons for the club. In his first season, he scored 13 goals in League matches and became 2nd best goal scorer of League. In 2003–04 season he scored 15 goals and was the top scorer of the Moldovan National Division. Shishelov won the Moldovan Cup in 2003 while playing for Zimbru Chişinău.

He got 28 caps and 11 goals for the national team between 2000 and 2012. He cannot play for the Uzbekistan national football team anymore, because he is now Russian citizen and double-citizenship is not allowed in Uzbekistan.

Honours

Club
Shinnik Yaroslavl
 Russian First League (1): 2001

Zimbru
 Moldovan National Division runners-up (1): 2002–03
 Moldovan Cup (2): 2003, 2004

Bunyodkor
 Uzbek League (1): 2007
 Uzbek Cup runners-up (1): 2007

Nasaf
 Uzbek Cup runners-up (1): 2012

Individual
 Uzbekistan Player of the Year 2nd (1): 2003
 Moldovan National Division Top Scorer: 2003–04 (15 goals)

Career statistics

Goals for senior national team

References

External links

Player statistics at Sportbox.ru 

1979 births
Living people
Uzbekistani footballers
Uzbekistani expatriate footballers
Uzbekistan international footballers
2004 AFC Asian Cup players
Pakhtakor Tashkent FK players
FC Shinnik Yaroslavl players
FC Lada-Tolyatti players
FK Andijon players
Changchun Yatai F.C. players
FC Nasaf players
FC Bunyodkor players
China League One players
Uzbekistani expatriate sportspeople in Russia
Expatriate footballers in China
FC Khimki players
FC Ural Yekaterinburg players
Expatriate footballers in Russia
Expatriate footballers in Moldova
FC Zimbru Chișinău players
Moldovan Super Liga players
Uzbekistani expatriate sportspeople in Moldova
Uzbekistani expatriate sportspeople in China
FC Zhemchuzhina Sochi players
Russian expatriates in China
FC Fakel Voronezh players
Uzbekistani people of Russian descent
Buxoro FK players
FC Zvezda Irkutsk players
Association football forwards
FC Novokuznetsk players
FC Oryol players